NFB Film Can is a Canadian film anthology television series which was broadcast on CBC Television in 1979.

Premise
Various National Film Board of Canada short films were presented in this series geared towards young audiences. Some titles included "The Sand Castle" (Co Hoedeman), "Soap Box Derby" (André Melançon director) and "The Ride" (Gerald Potterton director). Animated works were also seen during the series.

Scheduling
The half-hour series was broadcast on Wednesdays at 4:30 p.m. (Eastern) from 4 April to 5 September 1979.

External links
 

CBC Television original programming
1979 Canadian television series debuts
1979 Canadian television series endings